Bolshoy Dvor is a rural locality (a village) in Vasilyevskoye Rural Settlement, Vashkinsky District, Vologda Oblast, Russia. The population was 1 as of 2002.

Geography 
Bolshoy Dvor is located 16 km northeast of Lipin Bor (the district's administrative centre) by road. Glukharevo is the nearest rural locality.

References 

Rural localities in Vashkinsky District